Alma High School is a public high school in Alma, Nebraska, United States. It is part of the Alma Public Schools district.

Notable alumni 
 DiAnna Schimek, politician

References

External links 
 

Schools in Harlan County, Nebraska
Public middle schools in Nebraska
Public high schools in Nebraska